Vera Nikolaevna Putina (born 6 September 1926) is a woman who has since 1999 stated that Vladimir Putin ("Vova") is her son. The woman's claims contrast with Putin's official biography, which states that Putin's parents died before he became president. The Telegraph concluded that while the woman might be simply wrong or part of a public relations effort, the story "identifies the holes in the known story of Mr Putin's past". The official story is that Putin's parents were already in their forties when Putin was born, which leaves a gap of over ten years since the births of their previous sons, Albert and Viktor, neither of whom survived childhood. Details of the first ten years of Putin's life are scarce in his autobiography, especially when compared with other world leaders."

Putina lives in the village of Metekhi, about 18 kilometers east of Gori, Georgia. Putina says that Putin's father is a Russian mechanic, Platon Privalov, who got Vera pregnant while he was married to another woman. A "Vladimir Putin" was registered at Metekhi school in 1959–1960. Records show that his stated nationality is Georgian. Putina married a Georgian soldier Giorgi Osepahvili. Her husband pressured her to abandon her son, Putin. In December 1960, she delivered "Vova" back to his grandparents in Russia. Putina believes that the St. Petersburg-based "parents" referred to in Putin's official biography adopted her son from his grandparents.

Through her contacts, she learned that Putin had become a KGB officer. In 1999, she spotted Putin on television.
Putina says that Russian and Georgian people visited her village to pressure her to remain silent. A school teacher, who says she taught Putin, stated that she too had been threatened. Putina says she is ready to do DNA tests. Russian journalist Artyom Borovik's plane crash coincided with the documentary he was making about Putin's childhood, including a report about Vera Putina. Italian journalist Antonio Russo was reportedly also interested in Vera Putina before he was murdered.

References

External links
 Putin's mama – A documentary released in 2003.
 Vera Putina Article by Anticompromat.
 Article from Zeit Online

1926 births
Possibly living people
20th-century women from Georgia (country)
21st-century women from Georgia (country)
Ω